Oleksandr Eduardovych Shaposhnyk (born 18 June 1983, in Kharkiv) is a Ukrainian taekwondo practitioner, who competed in the men's flyweight category. He claimed a silver medal in the 58-kg division at the 2002 European Taekwondo Championships in Samsun, Turkey, and later represented his nation Ukraine at the 2004 Summer Olympics.

Shaposhnyk qualified as a lone taekwondo jin for the Ukrainian squad in the men's flyweight class (58 kg) at the 2004 Summer Olympics in Athens, by granting a berth and placing third from the European Olympic Qualifying Tournament in Baku, Azerbaijan. Shaposhnyk got off to a flying start with an impressive 7–5 victory over Yemen's Akram Abdullah, but he was cautiously thrashed by his Mexican opponent Óscar Salazar in the quarterfinal match at 2–6. In the repechage, Shaposhnyk was scheduled to fight against Dominican Republic's Gabriel Mercedes on his first attempt, but pulled himself out of the tournament due to his knee injury sustained from the previous match.

References

External links

1983 births
Living people
Ukrainian male taekwondo practitioners
Olympic taekwondo practitioners of Ukraine
Taekwondo practitioners at the 2004 Summer Olympics
Sportspeople from Kharkiv
European Taekwondo Championships medalists
21st-century Ukrainian people